Quick Menu is a graphical user interface for MS-DOS developed by OSCS Software Development, Inc.. Three versions were made: Quick Menu, Quick Menu II  and Quick Menu III.

In DOS users have to type all commands via the keyboard. By using the cd-command users could navigate through (sub)directories. The dir-command is used to show a list of all files in the current folder. The user had to search for the main startup file. This could be an EXE file, a COM file or a Batch file. An additional issue was that the directory could contain more of such files so it was sometimes unclear which was the main startup file. Normally, the correct startup command was in the manual or in a text file but the user had to remember the folder location and name of this main file.

Quick Menu offered a solution: it is a graphical user environment in which the user could create his own menustructure. In each menu a submenu or some kind of shortcut could be created. In such shortcuts the user had to define the location of the main startup file. Of course, the user had to create the shortcut manually and had to link it with the main startup file once. From then the user could easily navigate through the menu and select the program they wanted to launch.

Versions

Version I
Version I was released in 1990. It used a pure textual menu. The user could create some menu choices with a submenu and items which startup up a program.

Version II
This version was released in 1991. It was a real graphical interface where the user could create multiple screens. In each screen group icons and program icons could be placed together with a picture. The picture could be selected from an internal library or created with a picture editor which was part of the software. Background pictures could be set, passwords could be set on icons and main exit-command... Navigation was done by using the keyboard or a mouse.

Version III
Quick Menu III was more an expansion with more internal applications such as a calculator, file navigator and calendar. It was also possible to startup Windows 3.x-software. Actually, Quick Menu III launched Windows with the startup file of the select application as a parameter.

References

Graphical user interfaces